Christian Kohlund (born 17 August 1950 in Basel, Switzerland) is a Swiss actor and director.

Selected filmography
 The Cheese Factory in the Hamlet (1958), as School boy
 The Pedestrian (1973), as Erwin Gotz
  (1975), as Oberfeldwebel Schuster
  (1977), as Dr. Kristian Keller
  (1977), as Max Hergesell
  (1977), as Georg Rauh
 Derrick - Season 5, Episode 2: "Tod eines Fans" (1978, TV), as Konrad Peiss
  (1981, TV miniseries), as Thomas Waghorn
 Derrick - Season 12, Episode 1: "Der Mann aus Antibes" (1985, TV), as Bondeck
  (1985), as Thomas Stauffer
 The Black Forest Clinic (1986–1989, TV series, 35 episodes), as Prof. Alexander Vollmers
 Leo Sonnyboy (1989), as Adrian Hauser
 Bony (1992, TV series, 13 episodes), as Detective Sergeant Frank Fisher
 By Way of the Stars (1992, TV miniseries), as Karl Bienmann
 Abraham (1993, TV film), as Eshkol
 Anna Maria – Eine Frau geht ihren Weg (1994–1996, TV series, 33 episodes), as Alexander Langer
 Sun on the Stubble (1996, TV miniseries), as Marcus Gunther
 Nancherrow (1999, TV film), as Nikko Bernhoffer
 Alarm für Cobra 11 (1999, TV series, 2 episodes), as Carlos Berger
 Jesus (1999, TV film), as Caiaphas
 The Apocalypse (2002, TV film), as Quintus Maximus, a general
 Julius Caesar (2003, TV miniseries), as Lepidus
 Das Traumhotel (2004–2014, TV series, 20 episodes), as Markus Winter
  (since 2016, TV series), as Thomas Borchert

External links

Personal Site
Agency Jovanovic Munich 

1950 births
Living people
Swiss male television actors
Swiss male film actors
20th-century Swiss male actors
21st-century Swiss male actors
Actors from Basel-Stadt